Daniele Di Spigno (born 9 September 1974), is an Italian sport shooter who competed in the 2000 Summer Olympics, in the 2004 Summer Olympics, the 2008 Summer Olympics, and the 2012 London Olympics.

Records

References

External links
 

1978 births
Living people
Italian male sport shooters
Trap and double trap shooters
Olympic shooters of Italy
Shooters at the 2000 Summer Olympics
Shooters at the 2004 Summer Olympics
Shooters at the 2008 Summer Olympics
Shooters at the 2012 Summer Olympics
Shooters of Fiamme Oro